Salvador Sánchez Vázquez (born 21 October 1940) is a Mexican politician affiliated with the Institutional Revolutionary Party. As of 2014 he served as Deputy of the LIV, LVII and LIX Legislatures of the Mexican Congress as a plurinominal representative and as Senator for Nayarit in the LV and LVI Legislatures.

References

1940 births
Living people
Politicians from Tepic, Nayarit
Members of the Senate of the Republic (Mexico)
Members of the Chamber of Deputies (Mexico)
Presidents of the Senate of the Republic (Mexico)
Institutional Revolutionary Party politicians
National Autonomous University of Mexico alumni
20th-century Mexican politicians
21st-century Mexican politicians